Barzeliq (also Romanized as Barzelīq) is a village in Barvanan-e Sharqi Rural District, Torkamanchay District, Meyaneh County, East Azerbaijan Province, Iran. At the 2006 census, its population was 245, in 64 families.

References 

Populated places in Meyaneh County